Beaver Area School District is a suburban, public school district in Beaver County, Pennsylvania. The district encompasses approximately  serving the Boroughs of Beaver and Bridgewater and Brighton Township and Vanport Township in Beaver County, Pennsylvania and Monaca, Pennsylvania. The district serves a resident population of 1,972 people.

The district operates one High School, one Middle School and two Elementary Schools.

Elementary - College Square grades (grades K–2)
Elementary/Intermediate - Dutch Ridge (grades 3–6)
Beaver Area Middle School (BAMS) (grades 7–8)
Beaver Area High School (BHS) (grades 9–12)

Extracurriculars
The district offers a variety of clubs, activities and sports. They also offer classes to choose from, such as JROTC, band, orchestra, mock trial, and extra math classes.

Athletics 
Beaver's athletic teams all fall under the name Beaver Bobcats. Beaver's current athletic director is Ray Hoppa. Beaver is in the PIAA (Pennsylvania Interscholastic Athletic Association) and the WPIAL (Western Pennsylvania Interscholastic Athletic League).
Varsity Sports:  
Varsity Boys
Baseball
Basketball
Football
Golf
Soccer
Tennis
Cross Country
Track and Field
Archery
Swimming
Wrestling
Varsity Girls
Softball
Basketball
Volleyball
Soccer
Tennis
Cross Country
Track and Field
Swimming
Archery

Middle School and Junior High

Middle School and Junior High Sports – A middle school team is open only to students in 7th and 8th grade, and a junior high team includes 7th through 9th graders.

Fall
Middle School Boys Soccer
Middle School Girls Soccer
Middle School Boys Cross Country
Middle School Girls Cross Country
Middle School Girls Basketball
Junior High Football
Junior High Football Cheerleading (grade 9 only)

Winter
Middle School Wrestling
Middle School Boys Basketball
Junior High Boys Basketball (grade 9 only)
Hockey (club sport)

Spring
Middle School Girls Volleyball
Middle School Boys Track and Field
Middle School Girls Track and Field

Notable alumni 
 Amber Brkich, winner of Survivor: All-Stars
 O. Richard Bundy, Penn State Marching Blue Band director (1983–2015)
 John Burkett, MLB pitcher (1987-2003), National League All-Star (1993 and 2001) and currently a professional bowler
 Jerald Ingram, New York Giants current running backs coach
 John Skorupan, NFL linebacker (1973–1980), and Penn State (1969–1972) All-American
Johannes Weertman, noted glaciologist with a long career teaching at Northwestern University

References

External links 
 

School districts in Beaver County, Pennsylvania
Education in Pittsburgh area